Crassispira scala is a species of sea snail, a marine gastropod mollusk in the family Pseudomelatomidae.

Description

Distribution
This marine species occurs in the Indian Ocean off Zanzibar

References

 Weinkauff, H.C. & Kobelt, W. (1875–1887) Die Familie Pleurotomidae. Systematisches Conchylien-Cabinet von Martini und Chemnitz. Vol. 4. Bauer & Raspe, Nürnberg, 248 pp., pls. A, 1–42

External links
 

schillingi
Gastropods described in 1876